Phi Kappa Alpha may refer to:

Active until .
 Phi Kappa Alpha (Syracuse), a local, senior men's honor society at Syracuse University, recognizing campus leadership, active from –.
May have evolved into an honor society.

See also